Wowowillie is a Philippine noontime variety show aired by TV5. The show premiered on January 26, 2013, and was broadcast live from TV5's Delta Studio in Quezon City, with its main host and producer, Willie Revillame. The show earned the distinction of being the only noontime program to have a Strong Parental Guidance rating from the MTRCB, which was imposed due to the dancers' provocative outfits.

In September 2013, Revillame admitted in an interview that the show's ratings "fell below expectations", and contemplated on a possible cancellation. The show aired its final episode on October 12, 2013, nearly 9 months after its debut.

History
Revillame's previous show Wil Time Bigtime ended its run on January 5, 2013, as he announced in late 2012, and moved to the noontime slot under the title Wowowillie. It premiered on January 26, 2013, to coincide with the host's birthday the day after.

Cancellation
Citing competition from rival variety shows It's Showtime and Eat Bulaga!, TV5 confirmed Revillame's announcement expressing his intent on cancelling Wowowillie and focusing on other commitments, as the show struggled to gain a significant audience share.

On October 12, 2013, Wowowillie aired its final episode, with Revillame bidding farewell to his audience and crew in a speech. No further plans were announced regarding a possible replacement to the program. In 2020, TV5 announces its new noontime variety show Lunch Out Loud as blocktimer program between its affiliate Cignal Entertainment and Brightlight Productions of Albee Benitez as replacement for Wowowillie.

New show
On March 20, 2015, Revillame announced that he would sign a program contract with GMA Network to air a new program, Wowowin. The program would be his return to  television after he went on hiatus. Wowowin will be self-produced by Revillame's WBR Entertainment Productions, and former Wowowillie host and friend Randy Santiago will serve as the program's director. Also, the program marks Revillame's return to his original mother network, GMA Network, after hosting Lunch Date in the late 1980s with Randy Santiago. Wowowin premiered on May 10, 2015, on the Sunday Grande sa Hapon afternoon block of GMA Network and was aired internationally via GMA Pinoy TV.

Hosts

Main hosts
 Willie Revillame
 Randy Santiago

Co-hosts
 Mariel Rodriguez
 Grace Lee
 Camille Villar
 Arci Muñoz
 Ethel Booba
 Ate Gay
 Rufa Mae Quinto
 Nina Girado
 Abra
 Lovely Abella
 Ava Jugueta

Featuring
Anna Feliciano
Owen Ercia
Jeff Vasquez
DJ Coki
Wowowillie Money Girls
AJ Suller as Ligaya
Sandy Tolentino (of SexBomb Girls) as Liwayway
Wowowillie Girls

Segments
 BigaTEN ka!
 Rock 'n Rollin'
 Tutok to Win
 JOK Sing
 Mini Consyerto
 Putukan Na!
 ATN (Ayos The Number)
 InstaJAM (every Saturday)
 Willie of Fortune
 Pera S' Wil
 Jackpot Sa Surf
 Cash Salo

Studios

 TV5 Delta Studio - Quezon Avenue, Quezon City (2013)

Ratings
Wowowillie failed to surpass expectations in terms of TV ratings. The show's ratings were ranging from 3-5% and sometimes falling below 3%, while rivals GMA Network's Eat Bulaga! and ABS-CBN's It's Showtime ratings were ranging from 13-16% based on Kantar Media Philippines.

See also
 List of programs aired by TV5 (Philippine TV network)
 Wil Time Bigtime

References

External links

Philippine variety television shows
TV5 (Philippine TV network) original programming
2013 Philippine television series debuts
2013 Philippine television series endings
Willie Revillame
Filipino-language television shows
Obscenity controversies in television
Television controversies in the Philippines